Siret is a town, municipality and former Latin bishopric in Suceava County, northeastern Romania. It is situated in the historical region of Bukovina. Siret is the 11th largest urban settlement in the county, with a population of 7,721 inhabitants, according to the 2011 census. It is one of the oldest towns in Romania and was the capital of the medieval Principality of Moldavia during the late 14th century. Furthermore, the town administers two villages: Mănăstioara and Pădureni.

Administration and local politics

Town council 

The town's current local council has the following political composition, according to the results of the 2020 Romanian local elections:

Geography
The town of Siret is located at the north-eastern limit of Suceava County,  from the border with Ukraine, being one of the main border passing points in the north of the country, having both a road border post and a rail connection. 

Vicșani railway station is west of Siret and functions as the border control point for rail crossings between Romania and the border transit station at Vadul-Siret railway station in Ukraine. The rail is on a standard gauge on the Romanian side and continues as a Russian-style broad gauge into Ukraine. Siret is one of the few places in Romania which provides a gauge change equipment, allowing transportation without transfer.

Siret is situated at the half distance between Chernivtsi and Suceava, on the right banks of Siret River. The European route E85 crosses the city.

History 

During the period 1211–1225, on a hill near Siret a fortress was built by the Teutonic Knights. The town and the Teutonic castle were destroyed by the Tatars in 1241. The first document of Siret dates back to 1339, according to some historical sources. Seret is mentioned as a Russian city in Wallachia in the List of Russian cities (1370-1390). The town was the capital of the former principality of Moldavia, in the late 14thcentury.

The Russian Imperial Army occupied the town in 1770, and, as a consequence, an epidemic of cholera broke out. Together with the rest of Bukovina, Siret was under the imperial rule of the Habsburg monarchy (later Austria-Hungary) from 1775 to 1918.

During the Austro-Hungarian Empire (1774-1918) Siret was a city with a number of important Ukrainian institutions (branches of the Ruska Besida in Bukovina and the Ukrainska Shkola society; the Ukrainian Bursa, etc.).

During World War II, Siret was captured on 3April 1944 by Soviet troops of the 1st Ukrainian Front in the course of the Dnieper–Carpathian Offensive.

Religions 

Given the 14th century decline of the Byzantine empire as Orthodox regional superpower-ally and Latin mendicant orders missions since the 13th century, the prince Bogdan I of Moldavia obtained virtual independence in 1359 as founding voivode (autonomous prince), seeking aid and protection from Poland, welcomed Latin missionaries, Francescans (founding a monastery at Siret in 1340) and Dominicans. His son and indirect successor Lațcu of Moldavia (1365-1373) promised Rome his and the people's conversion to Catholicism and asked Pope Urban V to send missionaries and erect a Latin diocese in his principality's capital, Siret, which happened in 1371, initially directly subject to the Holy See until 1412 when it was made suffragan of the Archbishopric of Lviv (Lwów in Polish; now in Ukraine).

This Roman Catholic Diocese of Siret started to decline in 1388 when prince Petru of Moldavia transferred the Moldavian voivode's capital from Siret to Suceava, and was effectively suppressed, but from circa 1418, the Holy See erected another Moldavian bishopric, the Diocese of Baia, which inherited its territory ( 1434).

There was a Jewish community by the mid-16th century. Zionist activity began at the turn of the 20thcentury, a time when most of the local Jews worked in commerce. From 1912 to 1918, the mayor was Jewish and the town council included Jews. During World WarI, Jews fled in advance of the Imperial Russian Army, and found their property destroyed when they returned. After the union of Bukovina with Romania, the new authorities revoked licenses for Jewish members of the free professions and removed Jewish officials from their posts. In 1930, there were 2,121 Jews or 14% of the town's population. In 1936, Baruch Hager of the Vizhnitz dynasty was named rabbi and opened a yeshiva. During the interwar period, there was activity by Zionist youth movements. On June20, 1941, just before Romania's entry into World WarII, the authorities of the Ion Antonescu regime forced the Jews of Siret to march to Dornești before transporting them to Craiova and Calafat and finally Transnistria (see The Holocaust in Romania). Soviet troops liberated 460 Siret Jews there in 1944; 400 of them subsequently left for Palestine.

Today, most of the population is Romanian Orthodox, with Roman Catholic, Pentecostal, Greek-Catholic, and several Evangelical Christian minorities.

Demographics 

Siret reached its peak population in 1992, when more than 10,000 people were living within the town limits. In 2016, Siret had a population of  10,000 inhabitants.

According to the 2011 census data, 7,721 inhabitants lived in Siret, a decrease from the figure recorded at the 2002 census, when the town had a population of 9,329 inhabitants. In 2011, of the total population, 95.85% were ethnic Romanians, 2.55% Ukrainians, 0.72% Poles, 0.42% Germans (Bukovina Germans), 0.28% Russians (Lipovans). Siret is the eleventh most populated urban locality in Suceava County.

Notable natives 
 Yitzhak Artzi - Israeli politician
 Elisabeth Axmann - Romanian-German poet
 Leo Katz (1892–1954) - writer and journalist
 Mykhailo Mykhailyuk Ilkovych - Ukrainian poet
 Elisabeta Lipă - Romanian rower
 Ivan Pavlovich Maksimovich - Ukrainian Colonel of the UGA
 Victorin Ursache - Romanian archbishop
 Antin Varivoda - Ukrainian Commander of the Legion of Ukrainian Sich Riflemen; Colonel of the Ukrainian Galician Army

International relations 
Siret is a member of the Douzelage, a unique town twinning association of 24 towns across the European Union. This active program began in 1991, and regular events, such as a produce market from each of the other countries and festivals. Discussions regarding membership are also in hand with three additional towns (Agros in Cyprus, Škofja Loka in Slovenia, and Tryavna in Bulgaria).

Twin towns – sister cities 

Siret is twinned with:

 Altea, Spain - 1991
 Bad Kötzting, Germany - 1991
 Bellagio, Italy - 1991
 Bundoran, Ireland - 1991
 Granville, France - 1991
 Holstebro, Denmark - 1991
 Houffalize, Belgium - 1991
 Meerssen, Netherlands - 1991
 Niederanven, Luxembourg - 1991
 Preveza, Greece - 1991
 Sesimbra, Portugal - 1991
 Sherborne, United Kingdom - 1991
 Karkkila, Finland - 1997
 Oxelösund, Sweden - 1998
 Judenburg, Austria - 1999
 Chojna, Poland - 2004
 Kőszeg, Hungary - 2004
 Sigulda, Latvia - 2004
 Sušice, Czech Republic - 2004
 Türi, Estonia - 2004
 Zvolen, Slovakia - 2007
 Prienai, Lithuania - 2008
 Marsaskala, Malta - 2009
 Dębica, Poland

Gallery

References

External links 

  Siret Town Hall official site
  Siret unofficial site
  Laţcu Vodă High School, Siret
  The Chronic Diseases Hospital of Siret
  Suceava County site - Siret web page
  Photo Gallery - Old photos of Siret

Towns in Romania
Populated places in Suceava County
Former capitals of Romania
Romania–Ukraine border crossings
Jewish communities in Romania
Duchy of Bukovina
Localities in Southern Bukovina
Holocaust locations in Romania
Polish communities in Romania